Hempire is the fourth solo full-length studio album by American rapper Berner. It was released on April 15, 2016 via Bern One Entertainment. Production was handled by several record producers, including Drumma Boy, Max Perry, Scoop DeVille and TM88. It features guest appearances from Wiz Khalifa, B-Real, Atmosphere, Mistah F.A.B., Cozmo, Freeze, Hollywood, Juicy J, K Camp, Lil' Kim, Maejor, Project Pat, Quez, Smiggz, Snoop Dogg, Strap and Young Dolph. The album peaked at number 54 on the Billboard 200.

Track listing

Charts

References 

2016 albums
Albums produced by TM88
Albums produced by Drumma Boy
Albums produced by Scoop DeVille
Berner (rapper) albums